Canon EOS M2 is the second mirrorless interchangeable-lens camera produced by Canon. It was replaced by the Canon EOS M3 and Canon EOS M10 in 2015.

Design 

Similar to its predecessor, the Canon EOS M, the EOS M2 uses the Canon EF-M lens mount, an 18 megapixel APS-C sensor and a DIGIC 5 image processor. The newer EOS M2 adds phase detection autofocus for improved autofocus speed, plus integrated Wi-Fi with support for wireless image transfer and remote control via a smartphone app.  The camera has a 3-inch touchscreen with support for multi-touch gestures such as pinch to zoom, swiping and tapping.

The camera does not include a built-in flash or electronic viewfinder, but does support external Canon Speedlite external flashes via a hot shoe.  The EOS M2 was offered in certain markets as a kit including a Speedlite 90 EX flash. The camera can also accept Canon EF and EF-S lenses with an additional mount adapter. The camera is capable of supporting Standard Definition video at 30fps or 25fps, 720p HD video at 60fps or 50fps, and 1080p Full HD video at 30fps, 24fps or 25fps.

Sales 
The EOS M2 was announced in Japan in December 2013 with a suggested retail price of ¥64800 for the body only, or ¥84800 for a kit including the EF-M 18-55mm f/3.5-5.6 IS STM lens and Speedlite 90 EX flash.

Canon confirmed at the camera's launch that it had no plans to market the camera in Europe or North America.

References

External links 
 Technical Specifications

Canon EF-M-mount cameras